The 1946 Philadelphia Eagles season was their 14th in the league. The team failed to improve on their previous output of 7–3, winning only six games. The team failed to qualify for the playoffs for the 14th consecutive season.

Off Season 
With the war restrictions over the Eagles move their training camp from West Chester State Teachers College in West Chester, Pennsylvania, to Saranac High School Field in (Saranac Lake, New York)

NFL Draft 
The 1946 NFL Draft was held on January 14, 1946. There was 32 rounds and the Eagles had the 7 or 8th pick in the rounds. The top 5 teams in the league from the previous season did not get a draft pick in rounds 2 and 4 and were instead the recipients of compensatory low value picks in the 31st and 32nd rounds. The Eagles thus made 30 selections in this draft.

The overall number one pick in the draft was by the Boston Yanks and the choose Frank Dancewicz a quarterback from the Notre Dame.

Player selections 
The table shows the Eagles selections and what picks they had that were traded away and the team that ended up with that pick. It is possible the Eagles' pick ended up with this team via another team that the Eagles made a trade with.
Not shown are acquired picks that the Eagles traded away.

Schedule

Game recaps

Week 2 vs Boston Yanks 
For the first time in Eagles franchise history a Head coach has a .500 winning percentage. By winning this game the Eagles are 25–25–4 under Greasy Neale. The Eagles would have a 63–43–5 record, 3 Championship games appearances and winning 2 of them, under Neale lifetime as coach of the Philadelphia Eagles.

Standings

Roster 
(All time List of Philadelphia Eagles players in franchise history)

 Link to all time List of Philadelphia Eagles players in franchise history

References 

Philadelphia Eagles seasons
Philadelphia Eagles
Philadelphia